Dzenan Cisija (born 1976) is a Swedish politician. He was elected as Member of the Riksdag in September 2022. He represents the constituency of Gothenburg Municipality. He is affiliated with the Social Democrats.

References 

Living people
1976 births
Place of birth missing (living people)
21st-century Swedish politicians
Members of the Riksdag 2022–2026
Members of the Riksdag from the Social Democrats